GDI may refer to:

Science and technology
 Gasoline direct injection, a type of fuel injection
 Graphics Device Interface, a component of Microsoft Windows
 Guanosine nucleotide dissociation inhibitor, a protein

Organisations
 Gabriel Dumont Institute, in Saskatchewan, Canada
 Gardner Denver, an American manufacturing company
 Gay Doctors Ireland, a professional organisation
 GDI Integrated Facility Services, a Canadian janitorial service
 Girl Develop It, an American educational charity
 Gottlieb Duttweiler Institute, a Swiss think-tank
 Green Development Initiative, an international environmental organisation
 Gulf Drilling International, a Qatari oil and gas company

Other uses
 Baka language (ISO 639-3 code)
 Gender Development Index, an index of gender equality
 Gordil Airport (IATA code), in the Central African Republic
 Gross domestic income, the total income within a state
 Los Guerreros del Infierno, a Mexican professional wrestling stable